Denis Browne (1796-1864) was an Irish Dean in the middle of the 19th century.
 
Browne was born in County Mayo and educated at Trinity College, Dublin. He was for many years the incumbent at Enniscorthy. He was  Dean of Emly from 1850 until his death. He was a close friend of John Gregg, Bishop of Cork, Cloyne and Ross from 1862 to 1878. His grandson was the man who buried the poet Rupert Brooke.

References

1796 births
Alumni of Trinity College Dublin
Irish Anglicans
Deans of Emly
1864 deaths
Archdeacons of Raphoe
People from County Mayo